Longir may refer to:
 Longir-e Olya
 Longir-e Sofla
 Longir-e Vosta